Ex-Girlfriend may refer to:

 Ex-girlfriend, a former girlfriend
 "The Ex-Girlfriend", a 1991 Seinfeld TV show episode
 Ex Girlfriend (band), a female R&B/hip-hop band
 The Ex-Girlfriends, a pop group featuring Lupe Fuentes
 Ex-Girlfriends, a 2012 American romantic comedy-drama film 
 Ex-Girlfriends, a 2004 album by Low Millions
 "Ex-Girlfriend" (song), a 2000 song by No Doubt
 "X-Girlfriend", a song by Mariah Carey from the 1999 album Rainbow
 "X-Girlfriend", a song by Bush from the 1994 album Sixteen Stone
 The Ex (target), also known as the Ex-Girlfriend, a mannequin gun target

See also 
 EX (disambiguation)
 Girlfriend (disambiguation)
 eX-Girl, a Japanese pop trio